Face of War or Faces of War may refer to:

 The Face of War, a 1940 painting by Salvador Dalí
 The Face of War, a 1959 collection of war correspondence by Martha Gellhorn
 A Face of War, a 1968 documentary on the Vietnam War
 Faces of War, a 2006 computer wargame
 Faces of War Memorial, a Vietnam War memorial in Roswell, Georgia
 The Two Faces of War, a 2007 documentary on the memory of the Guinea-Bissau War of Independence